We Are the Champions of the World is a compilation album of material by the Chicago punk rock band The Lawrence Arms. Released in 2018 by Fat Wreck Chords, it spans the band's entire career, and includes songs that were released on Fat Wreck Chords, Asian Man Records, and Epitaph Records. It concludes with 5 non-album tracks taken from recording sessions for the 2006 album Oh! Calcutta!, four of which were previously unreleased on any format.

The release of the album was followed by a tour across the United States, and later Europe, playing shows with Banner Pilot, The Menzingers, The Lillingtons, Lagwagon, and more.

The title of the album is supposed to be ironic. In an interview with Alternative Press, singer Brendan Kelly stated that We Are the Champions of the World is actually not a greatest hits album, but rather a compilation album attempting to be representative of the musical evolution the band has gone through. The idea of putting out We Are the Champions of the World comes from Fat Wreck Chords owner and NOFX singer Fat Mike.

Track listing

Personnel 
Performers
Chris McCaughan - guitar, vocals
Brendan Kelly - bass, vocals
Neil Hennessy - drums

Production
All songs recorded by Matt Allison at Atlas Studios in Chicago unless otherwise noted.
Tracks 1, 3, 12, and 13 recorded in June 2003
Tracks 2, 5, 9, 15, 25, 27, and 29 recorded in October and November 2005
Tracks 4 and 7 recorded in January 2001
Track 6, 11, and 16 recorded from June to September 2013
Tracks 8 and 24 recorded in 2009
Tracks 10, 17, 18, and 23 recorded in September and October 2001
Tracks 14 and 19 recorded at Scientific Studios in December 1999 by Mike Giampa
Track 20 re-recorded in early 2005
Tracks 21 and 22 recorded in at Scientific Studios in Spring 1999 by Mike Giampa
Tracks 26 and 28 recorded in 2005 by Justin Yates

Artwork
 Eric Baskauskas - cover art, layout
 Ben Pier - photos
 David Holtz - layout

References 

2018 albums
The Lawrence Arms albums
Fat Wreck Chords compilation albums
Albums produced by Matt Allison (record producer)